All for Love is the third studio album by American R&B quintet New Edition, released by MCA Records on November 8, 1985. The album was certified platinum by the Recording Industry Association of America (RIAA). Also, this would be the final studio album to feature original group member Bobby Brown, who would shortly depart for a solo career until he would later return for their 1996 comeback album with the group, Home Again.

In the UK, the album was released on April 1, 1986.

Overview

History
By Spring 1985, New Edition was one of the biggest pop acts in the world after the success of their self-titled second album released the year before. However, the group was now in mortgage to MCA Records, as a result of having borrowed money from the label to disentangle themselves from a stifling production deal they mistakenly signed during the recording of their previous album. As a result, All for Love would become the first in a cluster of albums the group would be forced to record during this period to work off its debt.

Background and Brown's Departure
While most of the members were comfortable with the group's direction, Bobby Brown was becoming increasingly discontent and unappreciative with its bubblegum pop image. Brown was also agitated at having not been more prominently featured as a lead vocalist on the album. Vincent Brantley, the album's main producer, had originally sought to give Brown more solo spots. However, MCA balked at this idea — insisting that Ralph Tresvant continue to be used on principal vocals.  During a national tour in Oakland, California to promote the album, Brown often cut in on Tresvant's leads, performing more raunchily onstage, compared to his band mates. Also, Brown angered the group's management by disrespectfully throwing his mike in the air and being ungrateful when not getting his way onstage. Growing tension between Brown and his band mates eventually reached a standoff, which contributed to his being terminated from the group in December 1985. Following Brown's departure, New Edition would continue to promote All for Love as a quartet.

Release and reaction

Track listing

Non Album B-sides
 "Good Boys" (Ralph Tresvant, Ricky Bell) (3:50)
 "Sneakin' Around" (Ralph Tresvant, D. Eastman, B. Hart) (3:20)

Personnel
Ricky Bell – vocals, arranger, producer
Michael Bivins – vocals, arranger, producer
Bobby Brown – vocals
Ronnie DeVoe – vocals, arranger, producer
Ralph Tresvant – vocals, arranger, producer

Charts

Weekly charts

Year-end charts

Singles

Certifications

External links
 New Edition-All For Love at Discogs

References

1985 albums
New Edition albums
MCA Records albums
Albums produced by Freddie Perren